Joseph Soffietti (9 September 1912 – 30 January 2007) was a French racing cyclist. He rode in the 1937 Tour de France.

References

1912 births
2007 deaths
French male cyclists
Place of birth missing